Saint-Philippe-de-Néri is a parish municipality in the Canadian province of Quebec, located in the Kamouraska Regional County Municipality.

Demographics 

See also
 List of parish municipalities in Quebec

Municipal council
 Mayor: Gilles Lévesque
 Councillors: Jean-Pierre Bérubé, François Dionne, Michel Dionne, Henri Drapeau, Roland Lévesque, Lise Viens

References

Parish municipalities in Quebec
Incorporated places in Bas-Saint-Laurent